"Thinking of You" is a song written and recorded by American singer and songwriter Katy Perry from her second studio album, One of the Boys (2008). It was produced by Katy Perry and Butch Walker, and released on January 12, 2009, as the album's third single. "Thinking of You" deals with a break-up in which Perry does not want to move on but has no choice, and feels nostalgic of a previous lover while in a relationship with another man. Retrospectively, "Thinking of You" has been described as a favorite among her fans.

The song peaked at number 29 on the Billboard Hot 100 chart, becoming the album's only single not to reach the Top 10 in the United States. It peaked at number 27 in the United Kingdom. There are two music videos released for the song. The first was released in 2007 and features Perry in two different rooms—black and white—and was directed by a friend of hers. The second was the commercial release in 2009, which is set in the 1940s and features Perry playing a woman who lost her lover, a soldier (played by Matt Dallas), in battle during World War II. Perry began playing the song during gigs as early as 2006, and performed the song on all of her concert tours: the Hello Katy Tour, the California Dreams Tour, the Prismatic World Tour and Witness: The Tour. In South America, the song was included in the international soundtrack of Brazilian soap opera India, a Love Story and became very successful.

Background and composition
"Thinking of You" was written by Perry in 2002 and produced by Butch Walker. Amateur video of Perry performing an entirely acoustic version at the Hotel Café in Los Angeles as early as 2006 is available on YouTube. The song has been described as a soft rock ballad that was compared to Alanis Morissette and Evanescence. An audio video of the song was officially uploaded to Perry's YouTube channel on June 12, 2008. After music video premiere in December 2008, "Thinking of You" was chosen as the third single promoting the album, seeing its first official release on January 12, 2009, when it debuted on the US mainstream radio stations. The next month, the single was issued to American hot adult contemporary format, on February 10. In following weeks, "Thinking of You" received both digital and physical releases, with a CD being released first in Germany by Capitol Records, and later to whole Europe by EMI Music Publishing. On March 9, original and acoustic versions of the song were released on iTunes collectively, and separately on Amazon. Later that month, another CDs were released in the United Kingdom and France.

According to digital sheet music published at Musicnotes.com by Sony-ATV Music Publishing, the song is written in the key of E major and the tempo moves at 76 beats per minute. Perry's vocal range in the song spans from the low note of G♯3 to the higher note of C5. According to Perry, the lyrics of the song are about a break-up after which she doesn't want to move on but has no choice, and is thinking about her ex-boyfriend while she is with her current lover. Perry describes her former lover as "perfection" and feels disgusted with herself when she kisses her current boyfriend, calling him second best in comparison.

Critical reception

The song has received some retrospective praise, with Christopher Rosa of Glamour calling it a "fan favorite" and described it as her most emotional song compared to others in her discography, adding that it is "one of Perry's rawest vocal performances, but [the] chorus still packs a punch."

Writing for BBC Music, Lizzie Ennever exalted her vocal performance while commenting that the song possesses "edge" and "rawness" that, according to Ennever, are characteristic of the "real [Perry]". David Balls from Digital Spy described the track as a "serious offering designed to show off her vocal and songwriting talents", and compared it to the catalogues of Alanis Morissette and band Evanescence. Giving it three stars out of five, he wrote: "So does she succeed? Well, certainly not for want of trying." In a less positive review, Nicole Frehsee from Rolling Stone dismissed the song as "generic Dawson's Creek schlock".

Jon Caramanica of The New York Times favored the song's production, stating that Perry works better with melody and emotion. He contrasted the song—which he described as "gently and compellingly angry"—with Perry's singles of sexual themes, and concluded that "feeling deeply is shocking enough". For Contactmusic.com, Kelda Manley called the song "high quality" whereas NME reviewer Alex Miller jokingly regarded it as having "all the emotional subtlety of a flamethrower". A writer for The Boston Globe found similarities to Alanis Morissette's musicality in the track, such as her "sour melodicism" and vocals. Reviewing the single for Billboard, editor CT praised Perry for her "distinct vocal inflection". Another writer of Capital described it as "cracking" and "single material".

Chart performance
In the United States, "Thinking of You" attained moderate success. The song debuted on the US Billboard component chart Bubbling Under Hot 100 at number five. Three weeks later, it entered the primary Hot 100 chart at number 79; having climbed to number 50 in the following week. It rose fifteen spots one week after, giving the track the title of "Greatest Digital Gainer" for that chart issue. The following week, it reached a peak of number 29, where it stayed for more two weeks. By the seventh week spent on the chart, the song moved to number 31; from there on, it started plummeting down the chart. Following a chart progression of 34– 44– 51– 55– 67– 68– 84, it left the chart at number 91 on the May 9 chart issue. "Thinking of You" has sold 1.1 million copies in the United States as of January 2015.

Internationally, commercial outcomes for "Thinking of You" were likewise modest. In Europe, the song received moderate success. The song debuted at number 63 on the UK Singles Chart. After seven weeks on the chart, the song peaked at number 27. The song peaked at 38 on the Irish Singles Chart. In France, the song was much more successful, debuting at number 11 on the singles chart, and stayed in the charts for 32 weeks. The song peaked at number 29 on the Swedish Singles Chart and number 14 on the Italian Singles Chart. In Brazil the song peaked at number one and stayed there for several weeks, partly due to the use of the song in the Emmy-winning soap opera India – A Love Story. In Australia, the song debuted at number 34 on the Australian Singles Chart, which was its peak position. The single stayed in the charts for six weeks.

Music videos

Original version

The first music video was released in 2007 and surfaced on YouTube in May 2008. The video features Perry in two rooms: a white room in which Perry is happily in a relationship and a dark room with an unhappy Perry showing signs of regret. In the dark room, Perry smokes a cigarette as a man dressed in a suit sits beside her. Soon after, another woman enters and pushes Perry off to the side. Back in the white room, Perry sips red wine as her lover undresses beside her, while Perry's hands are wet with blood and there is blood on the bedsheets. The video ends with the revelation that Perry stabbed her lover in the white room in the back, as she sings tearfully while covered in blood before the shot spans to the side, showing the knife on the floor. The video uses a cross-cutting technique that compares the two relationships. Perry stated that the aim of the video was never to get a commercial release, but that it is just a simple video "made by a friend".

Commercial version
Perry revealed on her blog that she had already started filming a second and official music video in the first week of December 2008, directed by Melina Matsoukas. The video premiered exclusively on iTunes on December 23, 2008. The music video is presented as a flashback montage with a young woman whose lover, played by actor Matt Dallas, is killed in France during World War II, and begins with Perry in bed with another man, played by model Anderson Davis. Perry is clearly unhappy with her new partner and longs for her deceased lover as she looks at a photograph of him. Perry reminisces back to a bicycle ride with him, and looks out of her window to see a vision of the two of them laughing outside. Perry's current boyfriend approaches her and kisses her while she remembers a picnic with her former lover, as well as a trip to a lake. In another flashback, Perry slow dances with her former lover at a bar before emotionally waving goodbye to him before he goes to war. While Perry's new love kisses her, she imagines her old lover at a battlefield, being shot and clutching his chest. In another scene, Perry is tearfully applying makeup and putting on a funeral veil, and in another she is opening a letter informing her that her boyfriend has died in battle. After applying dark makeup and dressed in funeral attire, Perry walks out of her house to attend her dead lover's funeral. On April 16, 2012, Perry uploaded on her Vevo channel an "Extended Version" of the video. The video received largely positive reviews from critics.

Credits and personnel
Credits are adapted from One of the Boys album liner notes and "Thinking of You" CD release.

Publishing and locations
 Published by When I'm Rich You'll Be My Bitch / WB Music Corp
 Recorded at Deathstar Studios and  Butch's old house (Los Feliz)
 Mixed at Aus Studios (Studio City, Los Angeles)
 Mastered at Bernie Grundman Mastering (Hollywood)

Personnel

 Katy Perry vocals, songwriting
 Butch Walker instrumentation, production
 Darren Dodd drums
 Dan Chase keyboards, programming
 Paul Hager vocal recording
 Joe Zook mixing
 Brian "Big Bass" Gardener mastering

Track listing

CD single
 "Thinking of You" (album version) 4:09
 "Thinking of You" (live acoustic) 4:51

Digital download / French CD single
 "Thinking of You" 4:09

Digital download
 "Thinking of You" 4:09
 "Thinking of You" (acoustic) 4:51

Charts and certifications

Weekly charts

Monthly charts

Year-end charts

Certifications

Release history

References

2009 singles
2008 songs
2000s ballads
Katy Perry songs
Music videos directed by Melina Matsoukas
Songs written by Katy Perry
Song recordings produced by Butch Walker
Songs about loneliness
Rock ballads
Capitol Records singles
Pop ballads